La Redoute is a French multi channel retailer founded by Joseph Pollet in 1837.

La Redoute specialises in ready to wear apparel and home decor, La Redoute is the 2nd largest seller of women's apparel and the 3rd largest seller of linens in France. Its e-commerce site www.laredoute.com is the top ranked French site for apparel and home decor, with more than 7 million unique visitors each month. The company operates in 26 countries and has more than 10 million active customers.

A former subsidiary of Redcats Group, (formerly LaRedoute Group), itself part of Kering Group (formerly Pinault-Printemps-Redoute or PPR) since 1994, La Redoute was sold to its managers, Nathalie Balla and Eric Courteille, in June 2014.

History
La Redoute was founded in 1837 when Joseph Pollet, son of a rural family, moved to the capital of the French wool region, Roubaix. There he opened the first worsted spinning operation, inventing a number of processes. His son, Charles, took up the torch and, in 1873, built a factory on a plot at rue de Blanchemaille and rue de La Redoute. He decided to name the business Filatures de La Redoute (Spinners of La Redoute) after the name of the street in [Roubaix] where it was located.

See also
 3 Suisses

References

External links
 La Redoute website
 La Redoute french version
 La Redoute UK version
 Background on PPR acquisition of La Redoute

Retail companies of France
French companies established in 1837
Retail companies established in 1837
1837 establishments in France
Clothing brands of France
French brands
Online clothing retailers